Filippo Gragnani (3 September 1768 – 28 July 1820) was an Italian guitarist and composer.

Gragnani was born in Livorno, the son of Antonio Gragnani. Coming from a family of notable luthiers and musicians, he studied music in his home town with Giulio Maria Lucchesi, first studying the violin then later devoting himself to the guitar, becoming known as a virtuoso performer. 
 
Gragnani first published works for guitar and chamber music in Milan around the beginning of the 19th century with the publishers Ricordi and Monzino. During these times he travelled to Germany and eventually settled in Paris by 1810. There he befriended and became a pupil of Ferdinando Carulli, to whom he dedicated three of his guitar duets and who in turn also dedicated some duets to Gragnani.

Little is known about Gragnani after 1812. The "Registro dei Morti" (Register of Deaths) of the Church of St. Martino di Salviano in Livorno indicates he died on 28 July 1820.

Works
Some twenty compositions are known by Gragnani, of which fifteen have opus numbers.
Tre Sonate
Tre Duetti
Sinfonia
Sonata Sentimentale
Tre Divertimenti
Tre Duetti
Trois Duos, Op. 1
Trois Duos, Op. 2
Trois Duos, Op. 3
Trois Duos, Op. 4
Fantasia (solo guitar), Op. 5
Opus 6
Tre Sonatine e un Tema con Variazioni, Op. 6
Trois Duos, Op. 6
Trois Duos, Op. 7
Opus 8
Tre Dui (for violin and guitar), Op. 8
Quartetto for clarinet, violin, and two guitars, Op. 8
Sestetto (for flute, clarinet, violin, 2 guitars & cello in A major), Op. 9
Variazioni, Op. 10
Trois Exercices, Op. 11
Trio (for three guitars), Op. 12
Trio (for flute, violin and guitar), Op. 13
Trois Duos, Op. 14
Opus 15
Sonata Sentimentale (solo guitar), Op. 15
Divertimenti (solo guitar), Op. 15

Sources

Sheet Music
Rischel & Birket-Smith's Collection of guitar music Det Kongelige Bibliotek, Denmark
"Fantasia" Opus 5 at the Boije Collection, STATENS MUSIKBIBLIOTEK - The Music Library of Sweden

1768 births
1820 deaths
18th-century composers
18th-century Italian male musicians
19th-century Italian composers
Composers for the classical guitar
Italian classical composers
Italian male classical composers
19th-century Italian male musicians